Martin Du Bellay, Sieur de Langey (1495–1559) was a French nobleman and chronicler, and Prince of Yvetot by marriage.  His memoirs of the Italian Wars form one of the most significant primary sources for the period.

Works
Du Bellay, Martin, sieur de Langey. Mémoires de Martin et Guillaume du Bellay. Edited by V. L. Bourrilly and F. Vindry. 4 volumes. Paris: Société de l'histoire de France, 1908–19.
Du Bellay, Martin, sieur de Langey, Les mémoires de Mess. Martin du Bellay, Paris (1569)

References
Oman, Charles. A History of the Art of War in the Sixteenth Century.  London: Methuen & Co., 1937.

1495 births
1559 deaths
French princes
French military historians
16th-century French writers
16th-century male writers
16th-century French historians
French male non-fiction writers
Martin